The 1995 Bausch & Lomb Championships was a women's tennis tournament played on outdoor clay courts at the Amelia Island Plantation on Amelia Island, Florida in the United States that was part of Tier II of the 1995 WTA Tour. It was the 16th edition of the tournament and was held from April 3 through April 9, 1995. First-seeded Conchita Martínez won the singles title.

Finals

Singles

 Conchita Martínez defeated  Gabriela Sabatini 6–1, 6–4
 It was Martínez's 2nd title of the year and the 26th of her career.

Doubles

 Amanda Coetzer /  Inés Gorrochategui defeated  Nicole Arendt /  Manon Bollegraf 6–2, 3–6, 6–2
 It was Coetzer's 1st title of the year and the 7th of her career. It was Gorrochategui's 1st title of the year and the 5th of her career.

External links
 ITF tournament edition details

Bausch and Lomb Championships
Amelia Island Championships
Bausch & Lomb Championships
Bausch & Lomb Championships
Bausch & Lomb Championships